Fumée (French: smoke) may refer to:

Fumée (company)
Fumée, song by Reynaldo Hahn (1875-1947)
...à la Fumée, composition by Kaija Saariaho

See also
Fumee Lake
For the general term in cooking, see smoked